Nguyễn Thế Thảo, (born March 21, 1952 in Quế Võ District, Bắc Ninh Province) is a Vietnamese politician.

Nguyễn Thế Thảo graduated from the Tadeusz Kościuszko University of Technology in Kraków. He was chairman of the Hanoi People's Committee from 2007 to 2015 and is member of the Central Executive Committee of the Communist Party of Vietnam XI.

Honours 

 Bene Merito (2016)

References

1952 births
Living people
People from Bắc Ninh province

Tadeusz Kościuszko University of Technology alumni
Members of the 9th Central Committee of the Communist Party of Vietnam
Members of the 10th Central Committee of the Communist Party of Vietnam
Members of the 11th Central Committee of the Communist Party of Vietnam